The following list includes notable people who were born or have lived in Urbana, Illinois. For a similar list, see the category page People from Urbana, Illinois.

Academics and writing 

 Philip W. Anderson, earned the Nobel Prize in Physics (1977)
 John Bardeen, inventor of the transistor; awarded Nobel Prize in Physics (1956 & 1972); winner of IEEE Medal of Honor (1971)
 Iris Chang, author (The Rape of Nanking)
 Ward Churchill, author and political activist 
 David Forsyth, computer scientist; co-author of Computer Vision: A Modern Approach
 Eugie Foster, science-fiction writer
 Theodore Gray, co-founder of Wolfram Research and winner of the Ig Nobel Prize in Chemistry (2002)
 José Graziano, Brazilian agronomist; secretary general of the FAO
 Robert W. Holley, earned the Nobel Prize in Physiology or Medicine (1968); graduate of Urbana High School (1939)
 Braj Kachru, linguist; created the "circle model" of world English varieties
 Edwin G. Krebs, recipient of the Nobel Prize in Physiology or Medicine (1994); graduate of Urbana High School (1937)
 Paul Christian Lauterbur, earned the Nobel Prize in Physiology or Medicine (2003)
 Sir Anthony James Leggett, earned the Nobel Prize in Physics (2003)
 Hamilton O. Smith, earned the Nobel Prize in Medicine (1978)
 Thelma Strabel, novelist, grew up in Urbana
 James Tobin, earned the Nobel Prize in Economics (1981)
 David Foster Wallace, author (Infinite Jest); graduate of Urbana High School
 Brian Wansink, author (Mindless Eating: Why We Eat More Than We Think); professor at Cornell University
 Gregorio Weber, Argentinian spectroscopist and protein chemist, worked in Urbana from 1962
 Carl Woese, microbiologist; identified Archaea as a domain of life

Fine arts 

 Christopher Brown, painter, printmaker, and professor.

Media and music 

 Ken Baumann, actor (The Secret Life of the American Teenager)
 Jay Bennett, founding member of Wilco; solo musician; died in May 2009
 Emily Blue, singer-songwriter, Chicago Reader Award winner
 Deborah Blum, journalist, Pulitzer Prize winner, author of The Poisoner's Handbook
 Roger Ebert, movie critic; Pulitzer Prize winner
 Jennie Garth, actress (What I Like About You, Beverly Hills, 90210 and 90210)
 Erika Harold, 2002 Miss Illinois and 2003 Miss America; graduate of Urbana High School
 Michael S. Hart, author, inventor of the electronic book; founder of Project Gutenberg, first project to make ebooks freely available via the Internet
 William Slavens McNutt, screenwriter (Huckleberry Finn)
 Nina Paley, cartoonist, animator, and free culture activist
 Mark Roberts, actor, comedian, writer, creator of the TV series Mike and Molly
 Chic Sale, author, actor, and vaudevillian
 Virginia Sale, actress
 Gil Shaham, violinist
 David Ogden Stiers, actor (Major Charles Emerson Winchester III on the TV series M*A*S*H)
 Sasha Velour, drag queen, artist, fashion forward winner of Season 9 of RuPaul's Drag Race
 American Football (band), midwestern emo and math rock band
 Jeff Austin, Founding member and frontman of the bluegrass band Yonder Mountain String Band until his departure in 2014.

Fictional 
 HAL 9000, character in the film 2001: A Space Odyssey; upon "dying" claims he was made operational in Urbana

Business 

 Brady Dougan, CEO of Credit Suisse Group
Tony Hsieh, former CEO of Zappos
 Shahid Khan, CEO of Flex-N-Gate; owner of the Jacksonville Jaguars

Military 

 Larry Allen Abshier, U.S. soldier who defected to North Korea after the Korean War in 1962
 Charles Carpenter (Lt. Col.), U.S. Army officer and army observation pilot (Second World War); taught history at Urbana High School
 Reginald C. Harmon, first US Air Force Judge Advocate General; Mayor of Urbana

Politics and law 

 Thomas B. Berns, Illinois state legislator, civil engineer, and surveyor
 Bird Sim Coler, Comptroller of Greater New York
 George W. Dilling, mayor of Seattle from 1911 to 1912
 Stanley B. Weaver, Illinois state legislator, funeral director, and Mayor of Urbana
 William B. Webber, Illinois state legislator, lawyer, and mayor of Urbana
Dennis Yao, member of the Federal Trade Commission (FTC)

Sports 

 LaToya Bond, guard for the Indiana Fever (WNBA)
 Scott Garrelts, pitcher for the San Francisco Giants
 Jonathan Kuck, Olympic speed skater; silver medalist
 Ella Masar, forward for the Chicago Red Stars
Spencer Patton, pitcher for the Chicago Cubs

References

Urbana
Urbana